The 1976–77 National Football League was the 46th staging of the National Football League (NFL), an annual Gaelic football tournament for the Gaelic Athletic Association county teams of Ireland.

Kerry narrowly beat Dublin in the final.

Format 
All 32 counties of Ireland compete: 12 in Division 1 and 20 in Division 2.

Division 1 is composed of two groups of 6 teams (North and South). Each team plays the other teams in its group once, earning 2 points for a win and 1 for a draw. 
The first-placed team in each group advances to the NFL semi-finals.
The second-placed team in each group advances to the NFL quarter-finals.
The last-placed team is relegated.

Division 2 is composed of two groups of 10 teams (North and South). Each of these is further divided into two groups of 5. The top two in each group play semi-finals and finals, with the North champions and the South champions advancing to the NFL quarter-finals and being promoted.

Group stage

Division One (North)

Play-offs

Table

Division One (South)

Play-offs

Table

Division Two (North)

Group B play-offs

Inter-group play-offs

Group A Table

Group B Table

Division Two (South)

Inter-group play-offs

Group A Table

Group B Table

Knockout stage

Quarter-Finals

Semi-finals

Finals

References

National Football League
National Football League
National Football League (Ireland) seasons